Sebastian Augustinussen (born 6 May 1996) is a Danish handball player who plays for SønderjyskE Håndbold in the Danish Men's Handball League. He has played several matches for the Danish national junior and youth teams.

In March 2022, he signed a 3 year-contract with the Danish club SønderjyskE Håndbold.

He also participated at the 2013 Men's Youth World Handball Championship in Hungary, winning the title.

Achievements
 Danish Handball League:
 Winner: 2015
 Third place: 2019
LNH Division 1:
Runner-up : 2020

References

1996 births
Living people
Danish male handball players
Sportspeople from Aarhus